Avinash Yelandur (born 22 December 1959) is an Indian actor who stars predominantly in South Indian language films, notably in the Kannada and Tamil film industries. He has been in the industry for two decades and has acted in over 200 films. Known for his authentic portrayal of complex characters and versatility, Avinash is one of the most sought-after actors in the supporting category. He is one of the few actors to enjoy both critical and commercial success.

Early life 
Avinash was born in the town of Yelandur in Mysore district (now in Chamarajanagar district), in the Mysore State (now Karnataka), to Indira and B. K. Narayana Rao, a lawyer. After completing his education at Mysore's Hardwicke High School, Avinash went on to attend University of Mysore, where he obtained his master's degree in English literature. Drawn to theatre and cinema from a young age, he had an active theater life at Mysore and later at Bangalore. During the time, he taught English at the National Institute of Engineering, Mysore, and later at the MES college in Bangalore.

Career

Theatre 
His first job after his M.Phil. was that of an English lecturer in National Institute of Engineering, Mysore. He continued to teach at MES College Bangalore as one of the most popular lecturers of the college. However, soon his passion for theatre took him abroad to train in acting at Mermaid Theatre, London. On returning home, he worked in Kannada theatre as part of the renowned B Jayashree's troupe "Spandana" and with the Shankar Nag as part of his "Sanketh" for many years.

Films 
Films were a natural choice for Avinash after his debut in G. V. Iyer's "Madhvacharya" based on the life and times of the twelfth-century enlightened master as the protagonist Saint Madhva, a film that won several national and state awards. His debut in mainstream cinema however, was with Shivarajkumar's Samyuktha, which went in to become a hit with audiences, ushering him into the world of South Indian cinema. Since then, he has since acted in over 400 films in Kannada, Tamil, Telugu, Malayalam and English in a career spanning nearly three decades. He has worked with over two hundred directors such as K. Balachander, Girish Kasaravalli, T. N. Seetharam, A. R. Murugadoss, Puri Jagannadh, P. Vasu, Vetrimaaran, Vetrimaaran, Suseenthiran, Suri, Prashant Neel, Gautham Vasudev Menon and T. S. Nagabharana.

Avinash's most memorable acting roles to date are in Girish Kasarvalli's National award-winning Dweepa, where he played the protagonist opposite actress Soundarya, T. S. Nagabharana's National award-winning Chinnari Muththa, Chiguridha Kanasu and Singarrevva, and T. N. Seetaram's National Award-winning Mathadana. P. Vasu's hit series Chandramukhi, Apthamitra and Aptharakshaka were high points in his career and have fetched him several national, state smf popular awards. 5Ters, an experimental (computer graphics) children's film in Hindi gave him the opportunity of playing good and evil characters and he considers the film to be a high point of his career.

Apart from his diverse repertoire, he has had the privilege of playing major roles alongside doyens such as Rajkumar, Rajnikanth, Mammooty, Vishnuvardhan, stars such as Nagarjun, Venkatesh, NandhamuriBalakrishna, Shivarajkumar, Vijay, Vikram, Ajith, and also contemporary stars like Puneeth Rajkumar, Kiccha sudeep, Yash, Surya, Karthi, Arya, Siddharth, Mahesh Babu,udhay kiran, Prithviraj sukumaran and several of the younger stars of South Indian Cinema.

Personal life 
Avinash married Malavika, who was his co-star in the soap opera Mayamruga, in 2001. They have a son, Gaalav.

Awards and recognition 

Karnataka State Film Award for Best Supporting Actor for Mathadana (2000)
Filmfare award for Best Supporting actor for Aptharakshaka
Jury's special mention for Dweepa, Singarevva
South Indian cinematographers association award for Best Supporting actor for Matadana
Film Fans' Association award for Best Supporting Actor for Matadana, Dweepa
SIFA award for Best Supporting Actor for Aptarakshaka
Udaya TV award for excellence in cinema
Suvarna TV award for Prithvi
Aryabhata Award for Best Actor for TV series Shikari
Rajyotsava Award of the Karnataka State Govt
Kempegowda Award of the BBMP

Partial filmography

Other activities
Avinash is the founder member of Sneha Loka, a club to promote sporting activity among the film fraternity. He is also a former member of the executive committee of the Kannada Film Artists Association.

References

External links 
 

20th-century Indian male actors
21st-century Indian male actors
Indian male film actors
Male actors in Kannada cinema
Male actors in Tamil cinema
Living people
Filmfare Awards South winners
1959 births
People from Chamarajanagar district
Male actors in Telugu cinema
Recipients of the Rajyotsava Award 2022